Fickle may refer to:
Fickle, Indiana
The Fickle, a 1934 Iranian romance-drama film

People with the surname Fickle include:
Daniel Fickle (born 1980), American film director
Malindi Fickle, American actress

See also
Fat and Fickle, 1916 American comedy film
Fickle Hill, California
Fickle Friends, an indie rock band from Brighton, England
Jacob Earl Fickel (1883–1956), U.S. Air Force major general
La donna è mobile ("woman is fickle")
Little Miss Fickle, a character in the Little Miss series of children's books